The discography of Don Henley, singer and drummer for the rock group The Eagles, consists of five studio albums, two compilation albums, and 27 solo singles.

As a solo artist, Henley released his debut album, I Can't Stand Still, on August 13, 1982, via Asylum Records. This was his only album for the label. The album reached a peak of number 24 on the US Billboard 200 chart. It features the Top 5 single on the Billboard Hot 100, "Dirty Laundry". The single peaked at number three on the Hot 100 chart and was also certified Gold by the Recording Industry Association of America. His second album, Building the Perfect Beast, (Geffen Records, 1984) features the Top 10 singles "The Boys of Summer", "All She Wants to Do Is Dance", which reached number five and number nine on the Hot 100, respectively.

After five years of absence from new material, Henley's third studio album was released in 1989. The End of the Innocence became his first solo Top 10 album on the Billboard 200. By this time, the Eagles had charted five Top 10 albums. The End of the Innocence became Henley's best-selling album to date, being certified six-times Platinum in the US. A fourth studio album, Inside Job, was released on May 23, 2000, via Warner Bros. Records. No single released made the Top 40 of the Hot 100; however, "Taking You Home" reached number one on the US Billboard Hot Adult Contemporary Tracks chart. His most recent album is Cass County, released in 2015.

Albums

Studio albums

Compilation albums

Video albums

Singles

1980s

1990s

2000s–2010s

Other singles

Soundtrack singles

Featured singles

Other appearances

Music videos

References

Discographies of American artists
Rock music discographies
Disco